Palmer Lake is a lake in Okanogan County, in the U.S. state of Washington.

Fish that can be found in this lake are the black crappie, burbot, Largemouth bass, Smallmouth bass, Sockeye salmon, and the Yellow perch.

Known as Haipwil to the Indigenous people, Palmer Lake is named for James Palmer, who had a cattle ranch at the north end of the lake around 1875.

References

Lakes of Washington (state)
Lakes of Okanogan County, Washington